Kyohei Inukai (1913–1985) was a Japanese-American artist.

Biography
He was born Earle Goodenow in Chicago in 1913 to parents Kyohei Inukai (1913-1954) and Lucene Goodenow and later attended the Chicago Art Institute. He also attended the National Academy of Design and the Art Students League in New York City.

Earlier in his career he was an illustrator of children's books, His paintings have been shown at the Albright-Knox Art Gallery, Portland Museum of Art, and the Rose Art Museum.

See also
Kyohei Inukai (born 1886)

References

1913 births
Artists from Chicago
American artists of Japanese descent
1985 deaths